The 2012 Omaha Beef season was the thirteenth season as a professional indoor football franchise and their fourth in the Indoor Football League (IFL). One of 16 teams competing in the IFL for the 2012 season, the Omaha Beef were members of the United Conference.

The team played their home games under head coach Bruce Cowdrey for the first eight games of the season, before he was replaced by Andy Yost and James Kerwin as co-head coaches, at the Omaha Civic Auditorium in Omaha, Nebraska. The Beef earned a 6-8 record, placing 5th in the United Conference, failing to qualify for the postseason.

Schedule
Key:

Regular season
All start times are local to home team

Roster

Division Standings

References

Omaha Beef
Omaha Beef seasons
Omaha Beef